Old Bill Through the Ages is a 1924 British silent comedy fantasy film directed by Thomas Bentley and starring Syd Walker, Arthur Cleave and Jack Denton. The film was based on a series of cartoons by Bruce Bairnsfather. The screenplay concerns a soldier serving in the trenches during the First World War who falls asleep and travels through time, encountering a number of historical figures.

Cast
 Syd Walker - Old Bill
 Arthur Cleave - Bert
 Jack Denton - Alf
 Gladys Ffolliott - Queen Elizabeth I
 Austin Leigh - William Shakespeare
 Franzi Carlos - Ann Hathaway
 William Pardue - The Redskin
 Bruce Bairnsfather - Himself
 Wallace Bosco
 Douglas Payne
 Cecil Morton York
 Clive Currie
 Cyril Dane

References

External links
 

1924 films
British historical comedy films
1920s English-language films
Films directed by Thomas Bentley
1920s historical comedy films
Ideal Film Company films
British black-and-white films
British silent feature films
British fantasy comedy films
1920s fantasy comedy films
British historical fantasy films
1924 comedy films
1920s British films
Silent fantasy comedy films
Silent historical comedy films